Captain Frederick Charles Standish (20 April 1824 – 19 March 1883), often referred to as "Captain Standish", was a Chief Commissioner of Police in Victoria (Australia).

Biography 
Standish was born in 1824 at Standish Hall, Wigan, Lancashire, the second son of Lord Charles Strickland Standish (1790-1863) and Émilie (Emma) Conradine Matthiessen (1801-1831). He was educated at Prior Park College, Bath, and then entered the Royal Military Academy, Woolwich. He subsequently obtained a commission in the Royal Artillery, in which he served for nine years, and retired at the rank of captain.

Standish was a known gambler on English racecourses, and lost a significant amount of money. He sold his mortgaged property in 1852 and left England for the Australian colonies.

Standish went to Victoria in 1852, and in 1854 was appointed Assistant Commissioner of Goldfields at Sandhurst (Bendigo), and in 1858 Chinese Protector. On the resignation of Sir Charles MacMahon he was made Chief Commissioner of the Police. In 1879 he brought a contingent of Queensland Police Aboriginal trackers to assist in the hunt for the Kelly Gang. He resigned from the role of Chief Police Commissioner in 1880.

In 1861 he was installed as District Grand Master of the Freemasons of Victoria, English constitution. From 1881 to 1883 Standish was chairman of the Victoria Racing Club, and is credited with forming the idea to hold a horse race and calling it the Melbourne Cup.

Standish wrote of his experiences as a senior figure in the administration of early Victoria in The Leader, a Melbourne newspaper under the bylines "The Contributor" and "An Ex-Official" in a series of sixteen informative and historically valuable articles in 1887.

Standish's association with Marcus Clarke and his membership of the Yorick Club are discussed in Michael Wilding, 'A Friend of My People a Home: Marcus Clarke and Captain Frederick Standish', Quadrant, 56, July–August 2012, and in Wilding, 'Wild Bleak Bohemia: Marcus Clarke, Adam Lindsay Gordon and Henry Kendall: A Documentary', Australian Scholarly Publishing, 2014.

He died, unmarried, at the Melbourne Club on 19 March 1883.

See also 
 Standish family

External links 
 Standish Papers on The National Archives website

References

1824 births
1883 deaths
19th-century English people
People from Standish, Greater Manchester
Chief Commissioners of Victoria Police
English emigrants to colonial Australia
Australian horse racing officials
Police officers from Melbourne
English gamblers
People educated at Prior Park College